Rex Bazunu (born 29 December 1953) is a Nigerian sprinter. He competed in the men's 4 × 100 metres relay at the 1972 Summer Olympics.

References

1953 births
Living people
Athletes (track and field) at the 1972 Summer Olympics
Nigerian male sprinters
Olympic athletes of Nigeria
Place of birth missing (living people)